The Original Jill Scott from the Vault, Vol. 1 is a compilation album by American R&B singer and songwriter Jill Scott, released on August 30, 2011, by Hidden Beach Recordings. It follows the release of her 2011 studio album The Light of the Sun and contains previous unreleased tracks recorded by Scott when she was signed to Hidden Beach. The album was released as a result of the record label's lawsuit against Scott, who left in 2010.

The album charted at number 24 on the Billboard 200 and received positive reviews from critics, who applauded the songwriting and song selection. Scott's cover of "Lovely Day" was released as a single for the album.

Background 
In October 2010, Scott left her former record label Hidden Beach Recordings. She was subsequently countersued by Hidden Beach in a complaint that claimed she breached her six-album contract and owed millions of dollars in damages. Hidden Beach founder Steve McKeever said in 2010, "Scott is contractually required to deliver three more albums to Hidden Beach". Their complaint's allegation of damages owed cited the California Labor Code's "De Havilland Law" section, under which certain recording artists who wish to terminate lengthy recording deals are required to reimburse their labels in the amount the labels would have received under the terms of the contracts. The complaint also alleged that McKeever paid Scott's million-dollar advances when he was not required to, allowed her to keep merchandising revenue, paid $ 450,000 to fund a concert DVD that Scott ultimately asked not to be released, bought her lavish gifts, and allowed her a slower recording schedule for her to pursue an acting career.

The lawsuit was settled in 2011, resulting in plans for Hidden Beach releasing an album series of Scott's previously unreleased songs recorded for the label, the first being The Original Jill Scott from the Vault, Vol. 1.

Recording 
Following the settlement, Scott worked with Steve McKeever in compiling the music for The Original Jill Scott from the Vault from previous recording sessions. McKeever said of their selections, "These are unheard masterpieces, some of which were meant to be the centerpiece of future albums". They were taken from sessions during June 2000 to October 2007 at several studios in Philadelphia, including A Touch of Jazz (Studio C), Home Cooking Studios, Larry Gold Recording Studio, and Studio 609. Production for those songs were handled by Dre & Vidal, Carvin & Ivan, and DJ Jazzy Jeff, among others. Live songs were taken from Scott's 2000 and 2007 performances at the House of Blues in Los Angeles and the Hidden Beach Launch Party in Santa Monica, California.

The album was mastered using AfterMaster HD Audio. Its liner notes were written by McKeever.

Release and promotion 
The Original Jill Scott from the Vault, Vol. 1 was released on August 30, 2011, by Hidden Beach Recording, distributed through Universal Music Group. It was originally scheduled to be released in early June with the title Just Before Dawn: Jill Scott from the Vault, Vol. 1, referencing Scott's subsequent studio release The Light of the Sun and the compilation's songs having been recorded before that album. Steve McKeever said of the change, "In an effort to support her new [album], at Jill’s request we changed the title of our album and moved the release date as not to confuse the marketplace".

The album's pre-order was made available at the label's website, offering a limited edition, deluxe version of the CD, packaged with a DVD featuring all of Scott's past music videos and bonus live performances. The album will be released in both a standard 11-track edition and a deluxe edition, which includes two additional live tracks and a 20-page booklet with song lyrics and producer notes. The album's lead single, a cover of Bill Withers' 1977 song "Lovely Day", was produced by DJ Jazzy Jeff and made available for sale in April via the label's website.

The Original Jill Scott from the Vault, Vol. 1 charted at number 24 on the US Billboard 200 in the week of September 17, 2011. It spent four weeks on the chart. The album also reached number six on the Billboard Top R&B/Hip-Hop Albums, spending eight weeks on the chart.

Critical reception 

The album was well received by music critics. Allmusic editor Thom Jurek gave it three-and-a-half out of five stars and viewed it as distinctive from most "From the Vaults recordings", stating "Many of the tracks here are finished masters, and virtually everything will delight hardcore Scott fans." Jurek commented that its songs "showcase Scott in excellent voice" and wrote in conclusion, "it enhances the listener's idea of her perfectionist work ethic. It's not only listenable as an 'in process' document, but offers a slew of tracks in various stages that are simply a pleasure to listen to." Andy Gill of The Independent found the album "far better than most contractual fulfilment albums – possibly due to Scott's involvement in its compilation." Mark Edward Nero of About.com noted "the quality and depth of the material" and stated, "it fittingly displays all the talent, charm and creativity that helped propel her to stardom."

Track listing 

 The deluxe edition features the "original mix" of "The Light" as track 4 and a 12-minute "suite" version of "Running Away" as track 9.

Personnel 
Credits for The Original Jill Scott from the Vault, Vol. 1 adapted from Allmusic.

 Alric Anglin – arranger, producer
 Marc Baptiste – photography
 Ivan "Orthodox" Barias – engineer, producer, quotation author
 Anthony Bell – engineer, producer, quotation author
 Barry Benson – marketing
 Christopher Birch – drum programming, keyboards
 Eugenia Shata Bess "Chinah Blac" – background vocals
 Adam Blackstone – bass, producer, quotation author
 Ari Blitz – mastering
 Randy Bowland – acoustic guitar, electric guitar
 Jeff Bradshaw – trombone
 Matt Cappy – trumpet
 Patrick Casserly – executive producer
 Elden Davy – engineer
 Aaron Draper – percussion
 Erik Walls – electric guitar
 Chris Farr – saxophone
 Allen Frost – piano
 Ronald "P-Nutt" Frost – bass, drums, engineer, Fender Rhodes, instrumentation, producer, quotation author
 Thianar Gomis – A&R, administration
 Carvin Haggins – producer
 Mike Harrison – engineer
 Boyd James – arranger, producer
 Jazzy Jeff – producer
 Thornell Jones – marketing
 Pete Kuzma – engineer, producer, quotation author
 Steven Lam – photography

 Keith Major – photography
 Dave Manley – guitar
 George "Spanky" McCurdy – drums, producer
 Steve McKeever – executive producer, liner notes
 Wayna Morris – background vocals
 Tony Nuccio – marketing
 Tyrone Poe – A&R, administration
 Valvin Roane II – background vocals
 John Roberts – drums
 Larry Ryckman – mastering
 Jill Scott – background vocals, producer, vocals
 Wendell "Pops" Sewell – guitar
 Johnnie "Smurf" Smith – keyboards
 Fyah "Stah" Tahs – producer
 Noel Terrell – keyboards
 Jerrold Thompson – A&R, administration
 RaRe Valverde – background vocals
 Gerald Veasley – bass
 Felle Vega Flamenco – guitar, percussion
 Dale Voelker – art direction, design
 Kenneth Whalum III – saxophone
 Lyzel Williams – art direction, design
 Kori Withers – quotation author
 Marcia Withers – quotation author
 Eric Wortham – keyboards, producer
 Dwayne Wright – bass
 Shelly Yakus – mastering

Charts

References

External links 
 

2011 compilation albums
Albums produced by Dre & Vidal
Jill Scott (singer) compilation albums
Hidden Beach Recordings albums